St. Sava Church, St. Sava Serbian Church, St. Sava Serbian Orthodox Church, Saint Sava Church, or other variations on the name, is a commonly used name for specific churches within the Serbian Orthodox Church.
Notable uses of the term may refer to:

Canada

Saint Sava Serbian Orthodox Church (Edmonton, Alberta)
Saint Sava Serbian Orthodox Parish (Lethbridge, Alberta)
Saint Sava Serbian Orthodox Church (Vancouver, British Columbia)
Saint Sava Serbian Orthodox Church (Winnipeg, Manitoba)
Saint Sava Serbian Orthodox Church (London, Ontario)
Saint Sava Serbian Orthodox Church (Toronto)
Saint Michael the Archangel Serbian Orthodox Church in Toronto
All Serbian Saints Serbian Orthodox Church (Mississauga)
Holy Transfiguration Monastery
Saint Petka Serbian Orthodox Church
Serbian Orthodox Eparchy of Canada
Holy Trinity Serbian Orthodox Church (Montreal)
Saint Arsenije Sremac Serbian Orthodox Church
Holy Trinity Serbian Orthodox Church (Regina)
Saint Michael the Archangel Serbian Orthodox Church (Toronto)
St. Stefan Serbian Orthodox Church (Ottawa)
Saint Nicholas Serbian Orthodox Cathedral (Hamilton, Ontario)
Holy Trinity Serbian Orthodox Church (Regina)

Europe
St. Sava Church, Paris, France
Church of Saint Sava, Belgrade, Serbia
Saint Sava Serbian Orthodox Church, Stockholm, Sweden
Saint Sava Serbian Orthodox Church, London, United Kingdom
Serbian Orthodox Eparchy of Britain and Scandinavia

United States
St. Sava Church (Douglas, Alaska)
Saint Sava Serbian Orthodox Church (Phoenix, Arizona)
Saint Sava Serbian Orthodox Church (Jackson, California)
Saint Sava Serbian Orthodox Church (North Port, Florida)
Saint Sava Serbian Orthodox Church (St. Petersburg, Florida)
Saint Sava Serbian Orthodox Church (Joliet, Illinois)
Saint Sava Serbian Orthodox Monastery (Libertyville, Illinois)
Saint Sava Serbian Orthodox Church (Merrillville, Indiana)
Saint Sava Serbian Orthodox Church (Cambridge, Massachusetts)
Saint Sava Serbian Orthodox Church (Saint Paul, Minnesota)
Serbian Orthodox Cathedral of St. Sava, New York City
Saint Sava Serbian Orthodox Church (Broadview Heights, Ohio)
St. Sava Serbian Orthodox Cathedral (Parma, Ohio)
Saint Sava Serbian Orthodox Church (McKeesport, Pennsylvania)
Saint Sava Serbian Orthodox Church (Pittsburgh, Pennsylvania)
Saint Sava Serbian Orthodox Church (Cypress, Texas)
Saint Sava Serbian Orthodox Church (Issaquah, Washington)
St. Sava Serbian Orthodox Cathedral (Milwaukee)